Saint Phocas, sometimes called Phocas the Gardener (Greek:Φωκᾶς), is venerated as a martyr by the Catholic and Eastern Orthodox Churches.  His life and legend may have been a fusion of three men with the same name: a Phocas of Antioch, a Phocas the Gardener and Phocas, Bishop of Sinope.

History
Christian tradition states that he was a gardener who lived at Sinope, on the Black Sea, who used his crops to feed the poor and aided persecuted Christians. During the persecutions of Diocletian, he provided hospitality to the soldiers who were sent to execute him.  The soldiers, not knowing that their host was their intended victim, agreed to his hospitality.  Phocas also offered to help them find the person they were seeking.

As the soldiers slept, Phocas dug his own grave and prayed. He made arrangements for all his possessions to be distributed to the poor after his death. In the morning, when the soldiers awoke, Phocas revealed his identity.

The soldiers hesitated and offered to report to their commander that their search had been fruitless.  Phocas refused this offer and bared his neck.  He was then decapitated and buried in the grave that he had dug for himself.

Veneration
He is mentioned by Saint Asterius of Amasia (ca. 400). The name Phocas seems to derive from the Greek word for "seal" (phoke/φώκη),  which may explain his patronage of sailors and mariners.  A sailors' custom was to serve Phocas a portion of every meal; this was called "the portion of St. Phocas."  This portion was bought by one of the voyagers and the price was deposited in the hands of the captain.  When the ship came into port, the money was distributed among the poor, in thanksgiving to their benefactor for their successful voyage.  He is mentioned in the work by Laurentius Surius. This tradition may be connected to a similar practice among sailors in the Baltic Sea of giving food offerings to an invisible sprite known as the Klabautermann.

Other Gardener Saints
Saint Conon the Gardener (or of Pamphylia, Palestine, or Magydos)
Saint Serenus
Saint Fiacre

Notes
  St. Phocas is mentioned in W.H. Auden's poem Horae Canonicae  Sext I   Verse 6, 2nd line

External links
"St. Phocas, Gardener, Martyr", Butler's Lives of the Saints
Patron Saints Index: St Phocas
Saint Phocas
 San Foca l'Ortolano

Saints from Roman Anatolia
4th-century Christian martyrs
4th-century Romans
Year of birth unknown